The 2008 World Wrestling Championships were held at the Yoyogi National Gymnasium in Tokyo, Japan. The event took place from October 11 to October 13, 2008. The competition only featured wrestling in the Female Freestyle event. Traditionally, Wrestling World Championships are not held in Olympic years, but in 2008 a female championship was held because the 2008 Summer Olympics included only four of the seven FILA weight classes for females.

Medal table

Team ranking

Medal summary

Women's freestyle

Participating nations
139 competitors from 41 nations participated.

 (1)
 (4)
 (3)
 (7)
 (1)
 (2)
 (1)
 (7)
 (6)
 (5)
 (1)
 (1)
 (3)
 (1)
 (4)
 (1)
 (1)
 (7)
 (4)
 (7)
 (4)
 (3)
 (1)
 (1)
 (2)
 (7)
 (2)
 (6)
 (1)
 (3)
 (7)
 (1)
 (1)
 (2)
 (1)
 (5)
 (7)
 (7)
 (4)
 (4)
 (3)

See also
Wrestling at the 2008 Summer Olympics

References

External links
Official website

 
FILA Wrestling World Championships
Wrestling World Championships
World Wrestling Championships
Wrestling World Championships